Christine Nougaret, née Christine Françoise Marguerite Chapalain, (born 23 November 1958 in Saint-Mandé) is a French archivist and historian.

She has also held the chair of History of Institutions, Diplomatic and Contemporary Archival Science at the École des chartes from 2007 to 2019.

An internationally recognized expert on finding aids, she contributed to the development of the ISAD(G) standard.

She was named Officier des Arts et des Lettres in 2013, and Chevalier de la Légion d’honneur in 2014.

She is married to Roger Nougaret.

Publications 
Misère et assistance dans le pays de Rennes au XVIIIe siècle, Nantes, Cid-Éditions, 1989 
Les Instruments de recherche dans les archives, Paris, La Documentation française, 1999 (with Bruno Galland) 
Archives et nations dans l'Europe du XIXe siècle, Paris, École nationale des chartes, 2004 (with Bruno Delmas) 
Les Archives privées : manuel pratique et juridique, Paris, La Documentation française, 2008 (with Pascal Even) 
L'Édition critique des textes contemporains, XIXe-XXe siècle, Paris, École nationale des chartes, 2015 (with Elisabeth Parinet)

References

External links 
 Fiche sur le site de l’École des chartes
 Rapport de Mme Christine Nougaret - "Une stratégie nationale pour la collecte et l'accès aux archives à l'ère numérique"
 Publications de Christine Nougaret on CAIRN
 Christine Nougaret (prom. 1982) nommée vice-présidente du Conseil supérieur des archives on École Nationale des Chartes
 Presentation

Historians of the Napoleonic Wars
1958 births
Living people
People from Saint-Mandé
French archivists
Female archivists
École Nationale des Chartes alumni
Academic staff of the École Nationale des Chartes
Officiers of the Ordre des Arts et des Lettres
Chevaliers of the Légion d'honneur